David John Morris (born 31 August 1984) is an Australian Olympic aerial/freestyle skier who competed in 3 Winter Olympic Games in 2010, 2014 and 2018.  He is Australia's most successful male aerial skier, having competed across FIS World Cup, World Championships and Winter Olympic competitions. He is the first Australian male aerial skier to compete at two consecutive Olympic Games, and the first Australian Medalist in the Olympic Men's Aerials.

Early and personal life
Morris was born in Melbourne, as were his parents and siblings.  He has a younger brother and younger sister. Morris attended two primary schools: St. John’s Primary School, Mitcham and Our Lady of The Pines, Donvale and completed his secondary education at Whitefriars College, Donvale. Morris also spent 3 years in Denmark with his family from 1995–1997, he attended Rygaards International School.

After having to defer parts of his tertiary studies many times due to commitments with training and competing overseas, he graduated from Royal Melbourne Institute of Technology in 2011 with a Bachelor of Applied Science (Physical Education) with Honours 1st Class.

Much of his life has rotated around sport. At about four years of age he commenced a lifelong passion for gymnastics at the Nunawading Gymnastics and Sports Club (NGSC, formally known as the Nunawading Youth Club) and he learned to ski at age three.  He has demonstrated capabilities in cricket, diving and football but has always returned to gymnastics and from there to aerial skiing.

Morris is a supporter of the Carlton Football Club in the Australian Football League and is a member of the Melbourne Cricket Club.

He is a qualified Mathematics and Physical Education teacher and, when he is at home between training camps and competitions, occasionally works as an emergency relief teacher at Whitefriars College, Donvale.  He also coaches gymnastics, cheerleading and trampoline and is in demand as a motivational speaker.

Morris released his self-published autobiography "SECOND NATURE - The Making of a Professional Athlete" in December 2014 following his Olympic silver medal performance in Sochi 2014.
A detailed and personal account of his journey and struggles to become the only male on the Australian Aerial Skiing Team.

Skiing career

Early aerial skiing career
Morris' talent for acrobatics and his potential to become an aerialist was originally discovered while working as a gymnastics coach at NGSC, by Kirstie Marshall, former Australian World Champion aerial skier, who was the local State Member of Parliament at the time.

Since Australia did not have a program for male aerial skiers, Marshall volunteered to coach him on weekends in the basics of aerial skiing and when she was expecting her second child, she enlisted the help of former Australian male aerial skier Jonathan Sweet, as a personal coach until Morris was ready for private training overseas.

Competitive performance

Morris won his first medal (a Silver) in an International Skiing Federation (FIS) race (USA selections) on 20 December 2007 in Park City and has gone on to become Australia's most successful male Aerial Skier, finishing the 2012/13 season ranked second in the World Cup standings. He has achieved a number of wins in various FIS Competitions.
He was the first Australia Male Aerial Skier to win a World Cup gold medal, and in doing so he became Australia's most successful male Aerial Skier. He would later go on to win a Silver Medal at the Sochi 2014 Winter Olympic Games, becoming Australia's first male aerial skier to do so.

 Results as per the FIS, Source:

2010 Winter Olympics/Olympic debut

Morris' performances led to his selection in the Australian Olympic Team for the 2010 Winter Olympic Games in Vancouver, Canada, where he finished in 13th position.

He was the first Australian male to compete in aerial skiing at the Winter Olympics for 12 years.  During the Vancouver 2010 Games, Morris was coached by Jerry Grossi who formerly competed in aerial skiing for the USA.

Injury and comeback
In the 2010/11 competition season Morris injured his hip during a competition in Calgary, requiring surgery and a long recuperation.  As a result, he stepped out of competition during 2011/12 and re-evaluated whether to continue in the sport.  He used this break from the sport to complete his much deferred university course.

Having come to the view that he still had more to offer, Morris concentrated on regaining his fitness through gym work and recommenced competitive aerials in 2012/13.  His come-back season in 2012/13 proved to be his best ever with two podium finishes, including 1st place in Bukovel, Ukraine. His win was broadcast in Australia on Eurosport.

Morris was selected to compete for Australia at the Sochi 2014 Winter Olympics.
He remains the only internationally competitive male aerial skier in Australia at any level and is therefore ranked 1st in Australia.

2014 Winter Olympics

Morris was one of 60 members of the Australian Winter Olympic team in the 2014 Olympic Winter Games in Sochi, Russia. He competed in the Men's Aerial Skiing competition held on 17 February 2014, winning the silver medal. He was coached by Cord Spero and Eli Budd.

Morris was also elected to be the flag bearer for the Australian team at closing ceremony of the 2014 Sochi Olympic Winter Games.

2018 Winter Olympics
Morris competed in the 2018 Winter Olympics where he finished 10th in the men’s aerials final.

Awards
Apart from his sporting achievements and Olympic Silver Medal, Morris has also received various other honours and awards, including:

– 2014 Ski and Snowboard Australia Athlete of the Year, Joint winner with Torah Bright.

– 2014 Sir Wilfred Kent Hughes Award: Awarded by the Victorian Olympic Council.

– The award for "Senior Sportsman of the Year" at Whitefriars College in 2014 (David's high-school) has been named in his honour.

– 2013 Ski and Snowboard Australia Aerial Skiing Athlete of the Year.

Current statistics
As at 11 September 2015, Morris is ranked 30th in the world based on FIS points.
At the Sochi 2014 Olympic Winter Games, he qualified 3rd in the Olympic Winter Games selection rankings.  Morris finished the 2013–2014 Aerial Skiing World Cup season in 6th place. He has yet to compete in a subsequent World Cup season. 
He holds the Australian Record for the highest point score of 247.91 at the Lake Placid World Cup on 18 January 2013, and the second highest point score of 242.93 at the Val Saint-Côme Freestyle skiing World Cup on 12 January 2013, for two consecutive jumps in an international competition.

Training

Morris travels extensively to the USA, Canada, Switzerland and Finland to train, jumping on snow during winter, and into water during warmer months.  Morris is coached by Joe Davies and Jeff Bean, who formerly competed in aerial skiing for Canada. He has also benefited greatly from periodic coaching assistance by Michel Roth who is the Swiss Head Coach but is generous with his help for all athletes in aerial skiing. 
His coach at the Sochi 2014 Olympic Winter Games were Cord Spiro and Eli Budd.

References

External links
David Morris' Personal website
David Morris' first-person articles

Australian male freestyle skiers
Skiers from Melbourne
Living people
1984 births
Olympic freestyle skiers of Australia
Freestyle skiers at the 2010 Winter Olympics
Freestyle skiers at the 2014 Winter Olympics
Freestyle skiers at the 2018 Winter Olympics
RMIT University alumni
Olympic medalists in freestyle skiing
Medalists at the 2014 Winter Olympics
Olympic silver medalists for Australia